Bayside Secondary School is a high school in Quinte West, Ontario, Canada and is part of the Hastings & Prince Edward District School Board. It is one of the largest high schools by area in North America.

Bayside offers grades 7-12 and is the Hastings & Prince Edward District School Board site for secondary French Immersion. Other specialty programs include International Studies and Communication Technology. The  campus which includes a quarry, a woods and a bayshore area, provides an ideal setting for environmental science programs, outdoor physical education activities and geographical studies. A full range of extra curricular activities is offered such as male and female interschool sports, improv team and intramurals.

The school has seven computer labs and specialized programs including Advanced Placement, Musical Theater and NET Solutions (a three credit course offering opportunities in computer programming and engineering).

Bayside is known for the wide array of events that is held throughout the year that include the Reindeer Hunt, the Holiday Extravaganza, the annual spring Talent Show and the year-end Barbecue.

Athletics

Clubs and teams
Bayside is renowned across the Bay of Quinte area for their athletic programs, boasting some of the best Soccer, Tennis, Rugby, and Swimming programs in the province. The teams compete in the Bay of Quinte Division, of the Central Ontario Secondary Schools Association (COSSA); one of the 18 Associations governed by OFSAA. Bayside is a "AA" sports school. Their mascot is the Red Devil, and their sport teams carry the same name; the women colloquially use "She-Devils" for their team names.  The following is a list of the sports clubs and teams offered at the school:

Fall
 Boys Soccer (Junior and Senior) 
Boys Football (Junior and Senior)
 Girls Rugby Union (Junior and Senior)
 Co-ed Cross Country Running (Midget, Junior, and Senior)
 Girls Basketball (Junior and Senior)
 Boys Volleyball (Junior and Senior)

Winter
 Boys & Girls Ice Hockey (Varsity)
 Boys Basketball (Junior and Senior)
 Boys & Girls Wrestling (Varsity)
 Girls Gymnastics (Junior and Senior)
 Co-ed Swimming (Junior & Senior) 
Boys & Girls Curling
Boys & Girls Badminton

Spring
 Girls Soccer (Junior and Senior) - known as "Bayside FC"
 Boys Rugby Union (Junior and Senior)
 Co-ed Track and Field (Midget, Junior, and Senior)

Athletic Council
In 2012, the Athletic Council was reestablished, representing the views of athletes to staff, organizing sporting events and planning trips for the students.

References

External links
 
Profile at the Education Quality and Accountability Office (EQAO) web site

High schools in Hastings County
Quinte West
1971 establishments in Ontario
Educational institutions established in 1971